The 1976 Washington Redskins season was the franchise’s 45th overall and 40th in Washington, D.C. The season began with the team trying to improve on their 8–6 record from 1975, which they did, finishing 10-4, second in the NFC East behind the Dallas Cowboys. They would be eliminated from the NFL playoffs by the Minnesota Vikings. This was the first season as a Redskin for Hall of Fame running back John Riggins, signed as a free agent after spending the first five seasons of his career with the New York Jets. This was also the last season in which the Redskins would make the playoffs under Hall of Fame head coach George Allen.

Offseason

NFL Draft

Roster

Regular season

Schedule

Game summaries

Week 1

Week 2

Week 3

Week 4

Week 5

Week 6

Week 7

Week 8

Week 9

Week 10

Week 11

Week 12

Week 13

Week 14

Playoffs

Divisional

Standings

Awards, records, and honors

References

Washington
Washington Redskins seasons
Washing